Courcy is a commune in the Calvados department in the Normandy region in northwestern France.

Population

Sights
 Château de Courcy, 12th/13th-century castle.
 Church of  Saint Gervais and Saint Protais. The church was built, added to and altered between the 12th and 18th centuries. It is constructed of limestone with a tiled roof.

The choir dates from the 12th century. There is a 16th-century tomb. The nave and tower date from the 18th century. A 17th-century sacristry was replaced in 1830 by the present sacristy.

The church has been a listed monument historique since 1927.

See also
Communes of the Calvados department

References

External links

 
 

Communes of Calvados (department)
Calvados communes articles needing translation from French Wikipedia